The 1908 United States presidential election in Connecticut took place on November 3, 1908, as part of the 1908 United States presidential election. Voters chose seven representatives, or electors to the Electoral College, who voted for president and vice president.

Connecticut voted for the Republican nominee, Secretary of War William Howard Taft, over the Democratic nominee, former U.S. Representative William Jennings Bryan. Taft won the state by a margin of 23.51%.

Results

See also
 United States presidential elections in Connecticut

References

Connecticut
1908
1908 Connecticut elections